Christian Aaron Coomer (born October 31, 1974) is a Judge of the Georgia Court of Appeals.

Education

Coomer received his Bachelor of Arts in Communication from Lee University in Cleveland, Tennessee and earned his Juris Doctor at the University of Georgia School of Law.

Legal and military career

Coomer's professional experience included operating his own law practice and serving as a judge advocate in the U.S. Air Force Reserve's JAG Corps.  Coomer spent four years on active duty with the United States Air Force. Upon separating from active duty, he began serving in the reserve component as a member of Georgia Air National Guard and the Air Force Reserve. He has worked as a Special Assistant United States Attorney, represented the Air Force in labor and employment matters before federal and state agencies, served as general counsel to a military hospital, prosecuted courts-martial, trained military members on law enforcement standards and the law of armed conflict, and managed the busiest General Courts-Martial docket in the Air Force. Coomer completed Air Command and Staff College at Air University, Maxwell Air Force Base, Alabama. He has been awarded the Air Force Meritorious Service Medal and the Global War on Terrorism Medal, among other awards and decorations. He has attained the rank of Lieutenant Colonel.

State legislator service

Coomer was first elected to the Georgia House of Representatives as a Republican in 2010. He served as a Republican in the Georgia House of Representatives from 2011 to 2018. He served as Republican majority whip and member of the standing committees on Appropriations, Banks and Banking, Ethics, Judiciary Noncivil, Juvenile Justice, Retirement, Rules, and Transportation. He was also appointed to the Public Defender Council Legislative Oversight Committee, the Fiscal Affairs Oversight Joint Subcommittee, the Juvenile Justice State Advisory Group, and the Transit Study Commission. In 2017, Governor Deal appointed Coomer to the Court Reform Commission. The same year, Judge Coomer was named Legislator of the Year by the Georgia Chamber of Commerce.

Appointment to Georgia Court of Appeals

On September 14, 2018, Coomer was appointed to the seat vacated by Charlie Bethel. His appointment was effective October 31, 2018.

Consideration for Georgia Supreme Court

In 2018 Coomer was among three candidates under consideration for the Supreme Court of Georgia after the retirement of Harris Hines.

Personal

Christian met his wife, Heidi, at Lee University. They have three children, Christian, Collin, and Vivian.

Controversies

On March 6, 2020, Coomer was accused in a lawsuit by a former client of malpractice and fraud in a lawsuit.

The Atlanta Journal-Constitution reported in May 2020 that the Georgia Bureau of Investigation allegedly opened an investigation into Coomer based, at least in part, on the lawsuit filed by his former client for fraud and malpractice.

Coomer settled the fraud and malpractice lawsuit brought by his former client sometime in late July 2020.

The Georgia Judicial Qualifications Commission filed formal charges against Judge Christian Coomer on December 28, 2020.  These charges include 26 counts of alleged violations of Georgia's Code of Judicial Conduct.

References

External links
Official Biography on Georgia Judicial Branch website

1974 births
Living people
Assistant United States Attorneys
Georgia Court of Appeals judges
Georgia (U.S. state) lawyers
Lee University alumni
Republican Party members of the Georgia House of Representatives
United States Air Force officers
University of Georgia School of Law alumni
21st-century American lawyers
21st-century American politicians
21st-century American judges